Martin Emmrich and Andreas Siljeström were the defending champions but decided not to participate.
Philipp Marx and Florin Mergea won the title, defeating Tomasz Bednarek and Mateusz Kowalczyk 6–3, 6–2 in the final.

Seeds

Draw

Draw

References
 Main Draw

Open de Rennes - Doubles
2012 Doubles